Nacina Ves is a village and municipality in Michalovce District in the Kosice Region of eastern Slovakia.

History
In historical records the village was first mentioned in 1219.
The Hungarian State Archives record that the village was granted by King Bela IV to his son Nata and the name became Natafalva. (Village of Nata) The Natafalusi family were the nobles who controlled the town for hundreds of years, many of them moving after the Kuruc Wars in the early 18th century. 
In the late 19th century, records indicate that this was a "toth falu" (Slovak village) with a majority Slovak population, but with a sizeable Hungarian minority.
After Hungary was partitioned in 1920, Natafalva found itself in the newly created Czechoslovakia. Many Hungarian residents of the town left, immigrating to North America or back to what was left of Hungary.
The name was changed from Natafalva to Nacina Ves and during World War II, remaining Hungarians who did not swear that they were Slovaks were expelled.

Geography
The village lies at an altitude of 125 metres and covers an area of 15.803 km². The municipality has a population of about 1750 people.

Transport
The village has three bus stops with bus shelters. Regular bus routes available include to Michalovce, Strážske, Humenné and Vranov nad Topľou.

Nacina Ves also has its own small railway station, located west of the village, next to the local railway line between Michalovce and Humenné (part of the ŽSR regional line no. 191 between Michaľany and Lupków).

Gallery

See also
 List of municipalities and towns in Michalovce District
 List of municipalities and towns in Slovakia

External links

https://web.archive.org/web/20080111223415/http://www.statistics.sk/mosmis/eng/run.html 

Villages and municipalities in Michalovce District